Michelle L. Hayworth is a brigadier general in the United States Air Force. She is the current Director of Command, Control, Communications and Cyber Systems, for U.S. Transportation Command, at Scott AFB.

Dates of promotion

References

External links

Living people
United States Air Force generals
University of Nebraska alumni
Women in the United States Air Force
Year of birth missing (living people)